Page Hunt is a game developed by  Bing for investigating human research behavior. It is a so-called "game with a purpose", as it pursues additional goals: not only to provide entertainment but also to harness human computation for some specific research task.
The term "games with a purpose" was coined by Luis von Ahn, inventor of CAPTCHA, co-organizer of the reCAPTCHA project, and inventor of a famous ESP game.

Game rules
Page Hunt is only accessible through Internet Explorer, and requires Silverlight (freely downloadable from the Page Hunt website). 

Unlike the games of Luis von Ahn, Page Hunt is a single-player game. It does not support user registration (and hence does not rank players). 

Shown a webpage, the player must find the best keyword or keywords which would bring this page to the list of top 5 search results by Bing. The higher the rank of the page within the first 5 results, the more points the player gets. Achieving this without frequent queries earns a bonus. The game lasts for 3 minutes.

Scientific results
The data gained using Page Hunt has several applications:
 providing metadata for pages, 
 providing query alterations for use in query refinement,
 identifying ranking issues.

On testing a game internally, the following results were gathered (as described in “Page Hunt: Improving search engines using human computation games”):
about 27% of the pages in the test database had 100% findability (it means that all the persons who were shown this page could bring it to the 5 best results), while almost the same number of pages (26%) were found by nobody. Thereby, a relation between the length URL and a webpage findability could be postulated: The longer the URL of the webpage, the harder it was to "hunt" it.
Also the winning search queries were analyzed and classified. The queries that contain:

 Spelling or punctuation alterations
 Sitename to site alterations
 Acronym/Initialism-Expansion alterations
 Conceptual alterations

See also
Google Image Labeler
Foldit
ESP Game

References

External links
 L. von Ahn: “Games with a purpose”. Computer, vol. 29(6), pp. 92–94, 2006.
 H. Ma, R. Chandrasekar, C. Quirk, A. Gupta: “Page Hunt: Improving search engines using human computation games”. Proceedings of the 32nd international ACM SIGIR conference on Research and development in information retrieval, 2009.
 Blog entry about Page Hunt 

Human-based computation games